The 1984–85 Boston Bruins season was the Bruins' 61st season.

Offseason

Regular season

Final standings

November 11th 1984

Schedule and results

Playoffs

Adams Division Semifinals

Montreal Canadiens 3, Boston Bruins 2

Player statistics

Regular season
Scoring

Goaltending

Playoffs
Scoring

Goaltending

Awards and records

Transactions

Draft picks
Boston's draft picks at the 1984 NHL Entry Draft held at the Montreal Forum in Montreal, Quebec.

Farm teams

See also
1984–85 NHL season

References

External links

Boston Bruins seasons
Boston Bruins
Boston Bruins
Boston Bruins
Boston Bruins
Bruins
Bruins